Hasancalı is a village in the Musabeyli District, Kilis Province, Turkey. The village had a population of 1616 in 2022.

Demographics
English traveller Mark Sykes noted Hasancalı as a settlement inhabited by 400 Turks in early 20th century with nomadic Kurds dwelling around. It is currently also inhabited by Kurds of the Delikan tribe.

References

Villages in Musabeyli District
Kurdish settlements in Kilis Province